This is a list of Estonian television related events from 2017.

Events
 Eesti Laul 2017. Semi-finals took place on 11 and 18 February. The final took place on 4 March in Saku Suurhall.

Debuts

Television shows

Ending this year

Births

Deaths
29 October – Aarne Üksküla, actor (b. 1937)

See also
2017 in Estonia

References

2010s in Estonian television